Tomer is a Hebrew given name, usually masculine given name. It may refer to:

People
Tomer Chencinski (born 1984), Israeli-Canadian football player
Tomer Elbaz (born 1989), Israeli football player
Tomer Eliyahu (born 1975), Israeli football player
Tomer Frankel (born 2000), Israeli swimmer, European 2018 junior champion in the 100 m freestyle
Tomer Ganihar (born 1970), Israeli photographer 
Tomer Ginat (born 1994), Israeli basketball player
Tomer Haliva (born 1979), Israeli football player
Tomer Hanuka (born 1974), Israeli artist
Tomer Hemed (born 1987), Israeli football player
Tomer Heymann (born 1970), Israeli filmmaker
Tomer Kapon (born 1985), Israeli film and television actor
Tomer Orenstein (born 1996), Israeli musician
Tomer Shalom, Israeli professional wrestler
Tomer Sisley (born 1974), Israeli French actor and comedian
Tomer Steinhauer (born 1966), Israeli basketball coach and former player
Tomer Yosef (born 1975), Israeli singer 
Tomer Ben Yosef (born 1979), Israeli football player

See also

Tomer, Israeli settlement
Tomer Devorah, Jewish philosophical text
Toney (name)

Given names
Hebrew-language names